Duggirala is a village in Guntur district of the Indian state of Andhra Pradesh. It is the mandal headquarters of Duggirala mandal in Tenali revenue division. It is one of the major turmeric trading centres in the country.

History 
The Chola dynasty has its presence in the area during 12th century AD, based on the inscriptions on the temple of Kesavaswami in the village.

Geography 

A canal from Sitanagaram (Tadepalle) passes through the village, which draws water from Krishna river and forms a part of Western Delta system. It also houses the headlocks of Kommamuru and Nizampatnam canals.

Demographics 

The total population constitute  males,  females and  children (age group of 0–6 years). The average literacy rate stands at 76.75% with  literates. There are a total of  workers and  non–workers. The working population constitute  main and  marginal workers.

Government and politics 

Duggirala gram panchayat is the local self-government of the village. It is divided into wards and each ward is represented by a ward member. The village is also the headquarters for Executive Engineer of Krishna Western Delta system.  The village forms a part of Andhra Pradesh Capital Region and is under the jurisdiction of APCRDA.

Duggirala is a part of Mangalagiri assembly constituency of Andhra Pradesh. The present MLA of the constituency is Alla Ramakrishna Reddy of YSR Congress Party.

Economy 

Agriculture

Duggirala Agriculture Marketyard in the village is used for trading and exporting of agricultural commodities. The major crops cultivated include paddy, turmeric etc. Duggirala Turmeric Yard is the largest yard in the state, handling more than 30,000 bags of turmeric. It produces 10% of the total turmeric produced in the country and is exported to countries like Russia, United States, UK and Japan.

Industries

CCL Products (India) Limited has an instant coffee manufacturing plant at Duggirala. 
CCL Products (India) Limited, a listed public company limited by shares was founded in the year 1994 with the vision of creating only the finest and the richest coffee in the world.

Transport 

Local transport include, city bus services operated by APSRTC from Tenali bus station to Mangalagiri and Vijayawada. Tenali–Mangalagiri road passes through Duggirala. Rural roads connects the village with Chintalapudi, Emani,  K.R.Konduru, Manchikalapudi, Morampudi, Namburu, Penumuli and Pedapalem.

Education 

As per the school information report for the academic year 2018–19, the village has a total of 15 schools. These schools include 6 private and 9 Zilla/Mandal Parishad schools. Zilla Parishad High School in the village is the oldest school. It was established in the year 1912 and was then known as Sir George V Government Memorial Boarding School.

See also 

List of villages in Guntur district

References 

Villages in Guntur district
Mandal headquarters in Guntur district